Dalianraptor (meaning "Dalian thief") is a dubious genus of prehistoric bird that lived in China about 120 million years ago, during the Early Cretaceous Period that was found in the Jiufotang Formation of China. It was initially believed to have been a possible dromaeosaurid before it was described in 2005.

Discovery and naming 
The holotype, D2139, was discovered sometime before the 2000s, when Matthew Martyniuk saw a photograph of the holotype, which was then labelled as an undescribed possible dromaeosaurid. The type, and only known species, D. cuhe, was named and described by Gao & Liu in 2005.

More recently, it is being suspected that the specimen is a chimera forged for the fossil trade, namely a Jeholornis with the arms exchanged by those of an unnamed flightless theropod. If the holotype is not a chimera, then the placement of Dalianraptor within Aves is still uncertain.

Description 
Dalianraptor is very similar to the contemporary avialian Jeholornis, though it has a longer digit I (thumb-equivalent) and shorter forelimbs, which suggests it may have been flightless.

References 

Early Cretaceous birds of Asia
Prehistoric avialans
Bird genera
Fossil taxa described in 2005